"You Stole the Sun from My Heart" is a song by Welsh rock band Manic Street Preachers, released as the third single from their fifth studio album, This Is My Truth Tell Me Yours (1998), on 8 March 1999. All three members of the band—James Dean Bradfield, Sean Moore, and Nicky Wire—share the writing credits. The song reached number five on the UK Singles Chart and number two in Iceland.

Background and content
Wire has described the music as a mix of New Order and Nirvana: "something you might be able to go along with if you really do the audio equivalent of squinting – and explained that the drum loop (yes, more drum machines) was sampled by Moore from the sound of a pinball machine, of all things". In allusion to the sound of "You Stole the Sun from My Heart", Marc Burrows of Drowned In Sound proclaimed it "the most straightforward rocker here" and "catchy to the point of irritating".

The lyric concerns Nicky Wire's dislike of touring. He has said that as much as he enjoys being on stage, he hates the routine of travelling, soundchecks, hotels, and the homesickness it causes. The lyric "but there's no, no real truce with my fury" is a reference to a poetry book by R. S. Thomas entitled No Truce with the Furies. The song title is namechecked in a later Manic Street Preachers single, "Your Love Alone Is Not Enough". It was included on the 2002 compilation Forever Delayed.

Release
CD one contains a live version of the Clash's "Train in Vain" and the B-side "Socialist Serenade". The single was released on 8 March 1999 in the United Kingdom and reached number five on the UK Singles Chart, spending 12 weeks in the top 100. In Australia, "You Stole the Sun from My Heart" spent one week on the ARIA Singles Chart in April 1999, peaking at number 97. The single also peaked at number two in Iceland, number 20 in Ireland, and number 94 in the Netherlands, achieving a peak of number 24 on the Eurochart Hot 100. At the 2000 Brit Awards, "You Stole the Sun from My Heart" was nominated from "Best British Single" but failed to win the prize.

Music video
The video presents a dark/light contrast where the band plays in a room in front of a huge ornate feature window. Outside the weather rapidly alternates between stormy and sunny. Rabbits and animated birds also make an appearance.

Track listings
All music was written by James Dean Bradfield and Sean Moore except where indicated. All lyrics were written by Nick Jones except where indicated.

UK CD1
 "You Stole the Sun from My Heart" – 4:20
 "Socialist Serenade" – 4:12
 "Train in Vain" (live at the Newcastle Arena, 14 December 1998)  – 3:14

UK CD2
 "You Stole the Sun from My Heart" – 4:20
 "You Stole the Sun from My Heart" (David Holmes' A Joyful Racket Remix) – 5:12
 "You Stole the Sun from My Heart" (Mogwai Remix) – 6:09

UK cassette single
 "You Stole the Sun from My Heart" – 4:20
 "If You Tolerate This Your Children Will Be Next" (live at Cardiff International Arena, 21 December 1998) – 4:48

Credits and personnel
Credits are lifted from the This Is My Truth Tell Me Yours album booklet.

Studios
 Recorded at Chateau de la Rouge Motte (Domfront en Poiraie, France)
 Drums recorded and engineered at Big Noise Recorders (Cardiff, Wales)
 Mixed at Abbey Road (London, England)

Personnel

 James Dean Bradfield – music, vocals, electric guitar
 Sean Moore – music, drums, programming
 Nicky Wire – lyrics (as Nick Jones), bass
 Nick Nasmyth – Wurlitzer
 Martin Ditcham – percussion
 Mike Hedges – production
 Greg Haver – recording and engineering (drums)
 Ian Grimble – mixing, engineering
 Guy Massey – mixing assistant

Charts

Weekly charts

Year-end charts

Certifications

Release history

References

1998 songs
1999 singles
Epic Records singles
Manic Street Preachers songs
Music videos directed by Sophie Muller
Song recordings produced by Mike Hedges
Songs written by James Dean Bradfield
Songs written by Nicky Wire
Songs written by Sean Moore (musician)
Virgin Records singles